A demon is a malevolent supernatural entity. Historically, belief in demons, or stories about demons, occurs in religion, occultism, literature, fiction, mythology, and folklore; as well as in media such as comics, video games, movies, and television series. 

Belief in demons probably goes back to the Paleolithic age, stemming from humanity's fear of the unknown, the strange and the horrific. In ancient Near Eastern religions and in the Abrahamic religions, including early Judaism and ancient-medieval Christian demonology, a demon is considered a harmful spiritual entity which may cause demonic possession, calling for an exorcism. Large portions of Jewish demonology, a key influence on Christianity and Islam, originated from a later form of Zoroastrianism, and was transferred to Judaism during the Persian era. 

Demons may or may not also be considered to be devils: minions of the Devil. In many traditions, demons are independent operators, with different demons causing different types of evils (destructive natural phenomena, specific diseases, etc.). In religions featuring a principal Devil (e.g. Satan) locked in an eternal struggle with God, demons are often also thought to be subordinates of the principal Devil. As lesser spirits doing the Devil's work, they have additional duties— causing humans to have sinful thoughts and tempting humans to commit sinful actions.

The original Ancient Greek word  did not carry negative connotations, as it denotes a spirit or divine power. The Greek conception of a  notably appears in the philosophical works of Plato, where it describes the divine inspiration of Socrates. 

In Christianity, morally ambivalent  were replaced by demons, forces of evil only striving for corruption. Such demons are not the Greek intermediary spirits, but hostile entities, already known in Iranian beliefs.

In Western occultism and Renaissance magic, which grew out of an amalgamation of Greco-Roman magic, Jewish Aggadah and Christian demonology, a demon is believed to be a spiritual entity that may be conjured and controlled.

Belief in demons remains an important part of many modern religions and occultist traditions. Demons are still feared largely due to their alleged power to possess living creatures. In the contemporary Western occultist tradition (perhaps epitomized by the work of Aleister Crowley), a demon (such as Choronzon, which is Crowley's interpretation of the so-called "Demon of the Abyss") is a useful metaphor for certain inner psychological processes (inner demons), though some may also regard it as an objectively real phenomenon.

Etymology 

Daimōn most likely came from the Greek verb  ("to divide" or "distribute"). The Greek conception of a daimōn notably appears in the philosophical works of Plato, where it describes the divine inspiration of Socrates. The original Greek word  does not carry the negative connotation initially understood by implementation of the Koine , and later ascribed to any cognate words sharing the root.

The Greek terms do not have any connotations of evil or malevolence. In fact,  (which literally translates as "good-spiritedness") means happiness. By the early centuries of the Roman Empire, cult statues were seen, by Pagans and their Christian neighbors alike, as inhabited by the numinous presence of the Greco-Roman gods: "Like pagans, Christians still sensed and saw the gods and their power, and as something, they had to assume, lay behind it, by an easy traditional shift of opinion they turned these pagan daimones into malevolent 'demons', the troupe of Satan. Far into the Byzantine period, Christians eyed their cities' old pagan statuary as a seat of the demons' presence. It was no longer beautiful, it was infested." The term had first acquired its negative connotations in the Septuagint translation of the Hebrew Bible into Greek, which drew on the mythology of ancient Semitic religions. This was then inherited by the Koine text of the New Testament. The Western medieval and neo-medieval conception of a demon derives seamlessly from the ambient popular culture of Late Antiquity.

The English use of demon as synonym for devils goes back at least as far as about 825. The German word, however, is different from devil and demons as evil spirits, and akin to the original meaning of a Daimon.

Ancient Egypt 

Both deities and demons can act as intermediaries to deliver messages to humans. Thus they share some resemblance to the Greek daimonion. The exact definition of "demon" in Egyptology posed a major problem for modern scholarship, since the borders between a deity and a demon are sometimes blurred and the ancient Egyptian language lacks a term for the modern English "demon". However, magical writings indicate that ancient Egyptians acknowledged the existence of malevolent demons by highlighting the demon names with red ink. Demons in this culture appeared to be subordinative and related to a specific deity, yet they may have occasionally acted independently of the divine will. The existence of demons can be related to the realm of chaos, beyond the created world. But even this negative connotation cannot be denied in light of the magical texts. The role of demons in relation to the human world remains ambivalent and largely depends on context.

Ancient Egyptian demons can be divided into two classes: "guardians" and "wanderers". "Guardians" are tied to a specific place; their demonic activity is topographically defined and their function can be benevolent towards those who have the secret knowledge to face them. Demons protecting the underworld may prevent human souls from entering paradise. Only by knowing the right charms is the deceased able to enter the Halls of Osiris. Here, the aggressive nature of the guardian demons is motivated by the need to protect their abodes and not by their evil essence. Accordingly, demons guarded sacred places or the gates to the netherworld. During the Ptolemaic and Roman period, the guardians shifted towards the role of genius loci and they were the focus of local and private cults.

The "wanderers" are associated with possession, mental illness, death and plagues. Many of them serve as executioners for the major deities, such as Ra or Osiris, when ordered to punish humans on earth or in the netherworld. Wanderers can also be agents of chaos, arising from the world beyond creation to bring about misfortune and suffering without any divine instructions, led only by evil motivations. The influences of the wanderers can be warded off and kept at the borders of the human world by the use of magic, but they can never be destroyed. A sub-category of "wanderers" are nightmare demons, which were believed to cause nightmares by entering a human body.

Mesopotamia 

The ancient Mesopotamians believed that the underworld was home to many demons, which are sometimes referred to as "offspring of arali". These demons could sometimes leave the underworld and terrorize mortals on earth. One class of demons that were believed to reside in the underworld were known as galla; their primary purpose appears to have been to drag unfortunate mortals back to Kur. They are frequently referenced in magical texts, and some texts describe them as being seven in number. Several extant poems describe the galla dragging the god Dumuzid into the underworld. Like other demons, however, galla could also be benevolent and, in a hymn from King Gudea of Lagash ( 2144 – 2124 BCE), a minor god named Ig-alima is described as "the great galla of Girsu".

Lamashtu was a demonic goddess with the "head of a lion, the teeth of a donkey, naked breasts, a hairy body, hands stained (with blood?), long fingers and fingernails, and the feet of Anzû". She was believed to feed on the blood of human infants and was widely blamed as the cause of miscarriages and cot deaths. Although Lamashtu has traditionally been identified as a demoness, the fact that she could cause evil on her own without the permission of other deities strongly indicates that she was seen as a goddess in her own right. Mesopotamian peoples protected against her using amulets and talismans. She was believed to ride in her boat on the river of the underworld and she was associated with donkeys. She was believed to be the daughter of An.

Pazuzu is a demonic god who was well known to the Babylonians and Assyrians throughout the first millennium BCE. He is shown with "a rather canine face with abnormally bulging eyes, a scaly body, a snake-headed penis, the talons of a bird and usually wings". He was believed to be the son of the god Hanbi. He was usually regarded as evil, but he could also sometimes be a beneficent entity who protected against winds bearing pestilence and he was thought to be able to force Lamashtu back to the underworld. Amulets bearing his image were positioned in dwellings to protect infants from Lamashtu and pregnant women frequently wore amulets with his head on them as protection from her.

Šul-pa-e's name means "youthful brilliance", but he was not envisioned as youthful god. According to one tradition, he was the consort of Ninhursag, a tradition which contradicts the usual portrayal of Enki as Ninhursag's consort. In one Sumerian poem, offerings made to Šhul-pa-e in the underworld and, in later mythology, he was one of the demons of the underworld.

According to The Jewish Encyclopedia, originally published in 12 volumes from 1901 to 1906, "In Chaldean mythology the seven evil deities were known as shedu, storm-demons, represented in ox-like form." They were represented as winged bulls, derived from the colossal bulls used as protective jinn of royal palaces.

Judaism 

There are differing opinions in Judaism about the existence or non-existence of demons (shedim or se'irim). There are "practically nil" roles assigned to demons in the Hebrew Bible. Not all Jews believe in the existence of demons, and some famous authors, such as Maimonides, denied their reality, regarding them as mere images which people ascribe divinity to. Jews are not obligated to believe in the existence of shedim, as posek rabbi David Bar-Hayim points out. Some Rabbinic scholars assert that demons have existed in Talmudic times, but don't exist regularly in present. When prophecy, Divine intuition and Divine inspiration gradually decreased, the demonic powers of impurity have become correspondingly weak, too.

Hebrew Bible 
The Hebrew Bible mentions two classes of demonic spirits, the se'irim and the shedim. The word shedim (sing shed or sheyd) appears in two places in the Hebrew Bible. The se'irim (sing. sa'ir, "male goat") are mentioned once in Leviticus 17:7, probably a recollection of Assyrian demons in the shape of goats. The shedim, however, are not pagan demigods, but the foreign gods themselves. Both entities appear in a scriptural context of animal or child sacrifice to non-existent false gods.

From Chaldea, the term shedu traveled to the Israelites. The writers of the Tanach applied the word as a dialogism to Canaanite deities.

There are indications that demons in popular Hebrew mythology were believed to come from the nether world. Various diseases and ailments were ascribed to them, particularly those affecting the brain and those of internal nature. Examples include catalepsy, headache, epilepsy and nightmares. There also existed a demon of blindness, "Shabriri" (lit. "dazzling glare") who rested on uncovered water at night and blinded those who drank from it.

Demons supposedly entered the body and caused the disease while overwhelming or "seizing" the victim. To cure such diseases, it was necessary to draw out the evil demons by certain incantations and talismanic performances, at which the Essenes excelled. Josephus, who spoke of demons as "spirits of the wicked which enter into men that are alive and kill them", but which could be driven out by a certain root, witnessed such a performance in the presence of the Emperor Vespasian and ascribed its origin to King Solomon. In mythology, there were few defences against Babylonian demons. The mythical mace Sharur had the power to slay demons such as Asag, a legendary gallu or edimmu of hideous strength.

Talmudic tradition and Midrashim 

In the Jerusalem Talmud, notions of shedim ("demons" or "spirits") are almost unknown or occur only very rarely, whereas in the Babylonian Talmud there are many references to shedim and magical incantations. The existence of shedim in general was not questioned by most of the Babylonian Talmudists. As a consequence of the rise of influence of the Babylonian Talmud over that of the Jerusalem Talmud, late rabbis, in general, took as fact the existence of shedim, nor did most of the medieval thinkers question their reality. However, rationalists like Maimonides and Saadia Gaon and others explicitly denied their existence, and completely rejected concepts of demons, evil spirits, negative spiritual influences, attaching and possessing spirits. They thought the essential teaching about shedim and similar spirits is, that they should not be an object of worship, not a reality to be acknowledged or feared. Their point of view eventually became mainstream Jewish understanding.

The opinion of some authors is not clear. Abraham ibn Ezra states that insane people can see the image of se'irim, when they go astray and ascribe to them powers independent from God. It is not clear from his work, if he considered these images of se'irim as manifestations of actual spirits or merely delusions. Despite academic consensus, Rabbis disputed that Maimonies denied the existence of demons entirely. He would only dispute the existence of demons in his own life time, but not that demons had existed once.

Occasionally an angel is called satan in the Babylon Talmud. But satans do not refer to demons as they remain at the service of God: "Stand not in the way of an ox when coming from the pasture, for Satan dances between his horns".

Aggadic tales from the Persian tradition describe the shedim, the mazziḳim ("harmers"), and the ruḥin ("spirits"). There were also lilin ("night spirits"), ṭelane ("shade", or "evening spirits"), ṭiharire ("midday spirits"), and ẓafrire ("morning spirits"), as well as the "demons that bring famine" and "such as cause storm and earthquake". According to some aggadic stories, demons were under the dominion of a king or chief, usually Asmodai.

Kabbalah 
In Kabbalah, demons are regarded a necessary part of the divine emanation in the material world and a byproduct of human sin (Qliphoth). After they are created, they assume an existence on their own. Demons would attach themselves to the sinner and start to multiply as an act of self-preservation. Medieval Kabbalists characterize such demons as punishing angels of destruction. They are subject to the Divine will, and do not act independently.

Other demonic entities, such as the shedim, might be considered benevolent. The Zohar classifies them as those who are like humans and submit to the Torah, and those who have no fear of God and are like animals.

Second Temple Judaism 

The sources of demonic influence were thought to originate from the Watchers or Nephilim, who are first mentioned in Genesis 6 and are the focus of 1 Enoch Chapters 1–16, and also in Jubilees 10. The Nephilim were seen as the source of the sin and evil on Earth because they are referenced in Genesis 6:4 before the story of the Flood. In Genesis 6:5, God sees evil in the hearts of men. Ethiopic Enoch refers to Genesis 6:4–5, and provides further description of the story connecting the Nephilim to the corruption of humans. According to the Book of Enoch, sin originates when angels descend from heaven and fornicate with women, birthing giants. The Book of Enoch shows that these fallen angels can lead humans to sin through direct interaction or through providing forbidden knowledge. Most scholars understand the text, that demons originate from the evil spirits of the deceased giants, cursed by God to wander the Earth. Dale Martin disagrees with this interpretation, arguing that the ghosts of the Nephilim are distinct. The evil spirits would make the people sacrifice to the demons, but they were not demons themselves. The spirits are stated in Enoch to "corrupt, fall, be excited, and fall upon the earth, and cause sorrow".

The Book of Jubilees conveys that sin occurs when Cainan accidentally transcribes astrological knowledge used by the Watchers. This differs from Enoch in that it does not place blame on the angels. However, in Jubilees 10:4 the evil spirits of the Watchers are discussed as evil and still remain on Earth to corrupt humans. God binds only 90% of the Watchers and destroys them, leaving 10% to be ruled by Mastema. Because the evil in humans is great, only 10% would be needed to corrupt and lead humans astray. These spirits of the giants are also referred to as "the bastards" in the apotropaic prayer Songs of the Sage, which lists the names of demons the narrator hopes to expel.

To the Qumran community during the Second Temple period, this apotropaic prayer was assigned, stating: "And, I the Sage, declare the grandeur of his radiance in order to frighten and terri[fy] all the spirits of the ravaging angels and the bastard spirits, demons, Liliths, owls" (Dead Sea Scrolls, "Songs of the Sage", Lines 4–5).

Indian religions

Hinduism 

In the Veda, gods (deva) and demons (asura) share both the upper world. It is only by the time of the Brahmanas that they are said to inhabit the underworld. The identification of asura with demons stems from the description of asura as "formerly gods" (pūrvadeva). The gods are said to have claimed heaven for themselves and tricked the demons, ending on earth. During the Vedic period, gods aid humans against demons. By that, gods secure their own place in heaven, using humans as tools to defeat their cosmic enemies.

Asura, in the earliest hymns of the Rigveda, originally meant any supernatural spirit, either good or bad. Since the /s/ of the Indic linguistic branch is cognate with the /h/ of the Early Iranian languages, the word asura, representing a category of celestial beings, is a cognate with Old Persian Ahura. Ancient Hinduism tells that Devas (also called suras) and Asuras are half-brothers, sons of the same father Kashyapa; although some of the Devas, such as Varuna, are also called Asuras. Later, during Puranic age, Asura and Rakshasa came to exclusively mean any of a race of anthropomorphic, powerful, possibly evil beings. Daitya (lit. sons of the mother "Diti"), Maya Danava, Rakshasa (lit. from "harm to be guarded against"), and asura are incorrectly translated into English as "demon".

With increase in asceticism during the post-Vedic period, withdrawal of sacrificial rituals was consindered a threat to the gods. Ascetic humans or ascetic demon were supposed to be more powerful than gods. Pious, highly enlightened Asuras, such as Prahlada and Vibhishana, are not uncommon. The Asura are not fundamentally against the gods, nor do they tempt humans to fall. Many people metaphorically interpret the Asura as manifestations of the ignoble passions in the human mind and as symbolic devices. There were also cases of power-hungry asuras challenging various aspects of the gods, but only to be defeated eventually and seek forgiveness.

Hinduism advocates the reincarnation and transmigration of souls according to one's karma. Souls (Atman) of the dead are adjudged by the Yama and are accorded various purging punishments before being reborn. Humans that have committed extraordinary wrongs are condemned to roam as lonely, often mischief mongers, spirits for a length of time before being reborn. Many kinds of such spirits (Vetalas, Pishachas, Bhūta) are recognized in the later Hindu texts. According to Hinduism, demons are not inherently evil beings, but good by following their dharma what is being evil and deceitful. However, nothing is purely evil or good, and a demon could eventually abandon his demonic nature.

Buddhism 
Belief in demons does not constitute an essential feature in Buddhism. However, since belief in demons were common during the rise of Buddhism, they are integrated into the cycle of Saṃsāra. Accordingly, their malevolent condition is due to their bad karma from their previous lives. When Buddhism spread, it accommodated itself with indigenous popular ideas about demons.

Iranian demons

Zoroastrianism

The Zorastrian belief in demons (Daeva, later div) had strong influence on the Abrahamic religions, especially Christianity and Islam. The daevas seem to be a Zorastrian interpretation of the Hindu pantheon. Particularly Indra, one of the most eminent individual deities of Vedic texts, is portrayed as a malicious force only next to Ahriman, the principle of evil (devil).

But daevas are not merely the false gods of a past religion, but also embodiment of vices and fierce side of nature. Thraotona slays the daeva Azhi Dahāka, a serpentine or dragon-like creature with three heads. Thraotona's victory over Azhi Dahāka, is not the victory of a great warrior, but to show that people who live in accordance with Asha can overcome evil. Aeshma, a demon of wrath and destruction, appears to be the direct forerunner of Asmodeus (Sakhr in Islam) from Abrahamic religion. Winter too became associated with one of the daeva. Demons assault the souls when passing the Chinvat Bridge. While virtuous people ward them off and succeed on entering heaven, wicked souls fail and are seized by the demons. In hell, demons continue to torment the damned.

In Zarathustra's personal revelation, there are no individual daevas. They are always referred to as in a group and their worshippers are associated with violence and destruction:

but ye Daevas are all spawned from Evil Thought/ as is the grandee who worships you, and from wrong and contempt... ever since you have been enjoying those worst of things that mortals are to do/ to wax to the daevas' favor retreating from Good Thought/ losing the way from the Mindful Lord's wisdom and from Right.
— Yasna 32.3-4

In their state of wickedness, they lead mankind into sin and death:

So ye lure the mortal from good living and security from death/as the Evil Will does you who are daevas, by evil thought/ and that evil speech with which he assigns the deed to the wrongful one's control.
— Yasna 32.5

Demons are subordinate to the absolute power of evil, the Evil Will, embodied in Ahriman/Angra Manyu. They are both corrupted and evil themselves. Demons possess no substance on their own and can only attach themselves to material agents. People who worship demons are blamed to give them power. In the Gathas, the primary way for demons to corrupt humans and cause suffering, manifests through their worshippers. The Vendidad (Law against Daeva) is mainly concerned to ward off demons by offering laws for ritual purity. However, demons would not increase their power only through acts in their favor but also by every act against Ahura Mazda (supreme good). Everyday actions might be considered a form of demon-worship. For example, cutting one's hair or nails and keeping them on the ground is understood as a sacrifice to the demons. Just like the demons' power increase by acts of wickedness, they are weakened by good deeds. Performaning invocations of Ahura Mazda are considered especially helpful. The Vendidad further explores the possibility for humans to turn into demons. A human who performs sexual immoralities or worships demons becomes a demon after death. A wicked person might be considered a demon in his lifetime, but only turns completely into one after death.

The Bundahishn offers an overview about the creation of demons. The text explains that Ahura Mazda and Ahriman existed before the material world, one in light and the other in the abyss of darkness. When Ahriman assaulted Ahura Mazda, Ahura Mazda created a world as a battle place and Ahriman could be defeated. The first beings created by Ahura Mazda were the six Amesha Spenta, whereupon Ahriman counters by creating six daevas. The demons are not tempted but directly created by the principle of evil. According to the Bundahishn, the demons revive Ahriman, whereby calling him their father:

Rise up, thou father of us! for we will cause a conflict in the world, the distress and injury from which will become those of Ohrmazd and the archangels
— Bun 3.1

Book 3 of the Denkard describes demons as the opposite of the creative power of God. As such, they cannot create, but only corrupt, and thus, evil is merely the corruption of the good. Since demons can only destroy, they will ultimately destroy themselves. Chapter 30 questions the reality of demons, since their existence seem to rely on their destruction of good. Therefore, Ahriman and his demons would miss any substance and exist only as absence of good.

Manichaeism 
Manichaeism was a major religion founded in the third century AD by the Parthian prophet Mani, in the Sasanian Empire. One of its key concepts is the doctrine of Two Principles and Three Moments. Accordingly, the world could be described as resulting from a past moment, in which two principles (good and evil) were separate, a contemporary moment in which both principles are mixed due to an assault of the world of darkness on the realm of light, and a future moment when both principles are distinct forever. Thus, evil and demons played a significant role within Manichaean teachings.

There are numberless designations for various groups of demonic entities in Manichaean cosmology. The general term used for the beings of the world of darkness is dyw (dev). Before the demons attacked the realm of light, they have been in constant battle and intercourse against each other. It is only in the realm of darkness demons are described in their physical form. After their assault on the world above, they have been overcome by the Living Spirit, and imprisoned in the structure of the world. From that point onwards, they impact human's ethical life, and appear as personified ethical qualities, mostly greed, envy, grief, and wrath (desire for destruction).

Ibn al-Jawzi, in his work Talbīs Iblīs (devils' delusion), credits the Manichaeans with believing that each Light and Darkness (God and the Devil) consist of four bodies and one spirit. The bodies of Light (God) were referred to as angels, while the bodies of Darkness (Devil) were referred to as ifrits. Light and Darkness would multiple by angels and demons respectively.

In The Book of Giants, one of the canonical seven treatises also known from Jewish intertestamental literature, the Grigori (egrēgoroi) beget giant half-demon offspring with human woman. In the Middle Persian version of the Book of Giants they are referred to as kʾw, while in the Coptic Kephalaia as gigas. In accordance with some interpretations of Genesis 6:1–4, the giant offspring became the ancient tyrannic rulers over mankind, until overthrown by the angels of punishment. Nonetheless, these demons are still active in the microcosm, such as Āz and Āwarzōg. Views on stars (abāxtarān) are mixed. On one hand, they are regarded as light particles of the world soul fixed in the sky. On the other hand, stars are identified with powers hindering the soul from leaving the material world. The Third Messenger (Jesus) is said to have chained up demons in the sky. Their offspring, the nephilim (nĕf īlīm) or asrestar (āsarēštārān), Ašqalūn and Nebrō’ēl in particular, play instrumental roles in the creation of Adam and Eve. According to Manichaeism, the watchers, known as angels in Jewish lore, are not considered angels, but demons.

In the Shahnameh 

In the Shahnameh, written by the Persian poet Ferdowsi between c. 977 and 1010 CE, demonic beings called divs are recurring enemies of human civilization. Divs are often black, with long teeth, and claws as hands; a monstrous but humanoid shape. Despite their physical appearance, many divs are masters of supernatural sorcery, reflecting their former associations with the daevas. Div-e Sepid (White Div), leader of the divs, is both an outstanding warrior and a master of magic, who causes storms to overcome hostile armies.

The poem begins with the kings of the Pishdadian dynasty. They defeat and subjugate the demonic divs. Tahmuras commanded the divs and became known as dīvband (binder of demons). Jamshid, the fourth king of the world, ruled over both angels and divs, and served as a high priest of Ahura Mazda (Hormozd). Like his father, he slayed many divs, however, spared some under the condition they teach him new valuable arts, such as writing in different languages. After a just reign over hundreds of years, Jamshid grew haughty and claimed, because of his wealth and power, divinity for himself. Whereupon God withdraws his blessings from him, and his people get unsatisfied with their king. With the ceasing influence of God, the devil gains power and aids Zahhak to usurp the throne. Jamshid dies sawn in two by two demons. Tricked by Ahriman (or Iblis), Zahhak grew two snakes on his shoulders and becomes the demonic serpent-king. The King Kay Kāvus fails to conquer the legendary Mazandaran, the land of divs and gets captured. To save his king, Rustam takes a journey and fights through seven trials. Divs are among the common enemies Rustam faces, the last one the Div-e Sepid, the demonic king of Mazandaran.

The div in the Shahnameh might include both demonic supernatural beings as well as evil humans. It has been conjectured that the divs of the legendary Mazandaran might reflect human enemies of Iran. Zahak, inspired by the daeva  Azhi Dahāka, is not a de-graced deity, but a human tyrant, identified as an Arab, who slays his father in exchange for power. It is only after he was tricked by the devil for power, he grows serpentine heads on his shoulders and becomes less human.

Rustam's battle against the demonic may also have a symbolic meaning: Rustam represents wisdom and rationality, fights the demon, embodiment of passion and instinct. Rustam's victory over the White Div is also a triumph over men's lower drives, and killing the demon is a way to purge the human soul from such evil inclinations. The killing of the White Div is an inevitable act to restore the human king's eyesight. Eliminating the divs is an act of self-preservation to safeguard the good in oneself's, and the part acceptable in a regulated society.

Native North American demons

Wendigo 

The Algonquian people traditionally believe in a spirit called a wendigo. The spirit is believed to possess people who then become cannibals. In Athabaskan folklore, there is a belief in wechuge, a similar cannibal spirit.

Christianity

Old Testament 
The existence of demons as inherently malicious spirits within Old Testamental texts is absent. Though there are evil spirits sent by YHWH, they can hardly be called demons, since they serve and do not oppose the governing deity. First then the Hebrew Bible was translated into Greek, the "gods of other nations" were merged into a single category of demons (daimones) with implied negativity.

The Greek Daimons were associated with demi-divine entities, deities, illnesses and fortune-telling. The Jewish translators rendered them all as demons, depicting their power as nullified comparable to the description of shedim in the Tanakh. Although all these supernatural powers were translated, none were angels, despite sharing a similar function to that of the Greek Daimon. This established a dualism between the angels on God's side and negatively evaluated demons of pagan origin. Their relationship to the God-head became the main difference between angels and demons, not their degree of benevolence. Both angels and demons might be fierce and terrifying. However, the angels act always at service of the high god of the Israelites, differing from the pagan demons, who represent the powers of foreign deities.
The Septuagint refers to evil spirits as demons (daimon).

New Testament 

Through the New Testament, demons appear 55 times, and 46 times in reference to demonic possession or exorcisms. Some old English Bible translations such as King James Version do not have the word 'demon' in their vocabulary and translate it as 'devil'. As adversaries of Jesus, demons are not morally ambivalent spirits, but evil; causes of misery, suffering, and death. They are not tempters, but the cause of pain, suffering, and maladies, both physical and mental. Temptation is reserved for the devil only. Unlike spirits in pagan beliefs, demons are not intermediary spirits who must be sacrificed for the appeasement of a deity. Possession also shows no trace of positivity, contrary to some pagan depictions of spirit possession. They are explicitly said to be ruled by the Devil or Beelzebub. Their origin is unclear, the texts take the existence of demons for granted. Many early Christians, like Irenaeus, Justin Martyr, Clement of Alexandria, and Lactantius assumed demons were ghosts of the Nephilim, known from Intertestamental writings. Because of references to Satan as the lord of demons, and evil angels of Satan throughout the New Testament, other scholars identified fallen angels with demons. Demons as entirely evil entities, who have been born evil, may not fit the proposed origin of evil in free will, taught in alternate or opposing theologies.

Pseudepigrapha and deuterocanonical books 

Demons are included in biblical interpretation. In the story of Passover, the Bible tells the story as "the Lord struck down all the firstborn in Egypt". In the Book of Jubilees, which is considered canonical only by the Ethiopian Orthodox Church, this same event is told slightly differently: "All the powers of [the demon] Mastema had been let loose to slay all the first-born in the land of Egypt. And the powers of the Lord did everything according as the Lord commanded them." (Jubilees 49:2–4)

In the Genesis flood narrative, the author explains how God was noticing "how corrupt the earth had become, for all the people on earth had corrupted their ways". In Jubilees, the sins of man are attributed to "the unclean demons [who] began to lead astray the children of the sons of Noah, and to make to err and destroy them" (Jubilees 10:1). In Jubilees, Mastema questions the loyalty of Abraham and tells God to "bid him offer him as a burnt offering on the altar, and Thou wilt see if he will do this command" (Jubilees 17:16). The discrepancy between the story in Jubilees and the story in Genesis 22 exists with the presence of Mastema. In Genesis, God tests the will of Abraham merely to determine whether he is a true follower, however; in Jubilees, Mastema has an agenda behind promoting the sacrifice of Abraham's son, "an even more demonic act than that of Satan in Job". In Jubilees, where Mastema, an angel tasked with tempting mortals into sin and iniquity, requests that God give him a tenth of the spirits of the children of the watchers, demons, in order to aid the process (Jubilees 10:7–9). These demons are passed into Mastema's authority, where once again, an angel is in charge of demonic spirits.

In the Testament of Solomon, written sometime in the first three centuries C.E., the demon Asmodeus explains that he is the son of an angel and a human mother. Another demon describes himself as having died in the "massacre in the age of giants". Beelzeboul, the prince of demons, appears as a fallen angel, not as a demon, but makes people worship demons as their gods.

Christian demonology 

Since Early Christianity, demonology has developed from a simple acceptance of demons to a complex study that has grown from the original ideas taken from Jewish demonology and Christian scriptures. Christian demonology is studied in depth within the Roman Catholic Church, although many other Christian churches affirm and discuss the existence of demons.

Building upon the few references to daimon in the New Testament, especially the poetry of the Book of Revelation, Christian writers of apocrypha from the second century onwards created a more complicated tapestry of beliefs about "demons" that was largely independent of Christian scripture.

While daimons were considered as both potentially benevolent or malevolent, Origen argued against Celsus that daimons are exclusively evil entities, supporting the later idea of (evil) demons. According to Origen's cosmology, increasing corruption and evil within the soul, the more estranged the soul gets from God. Therefore, Origen opined that the most evil demons are located underground. Besides the fallen angels known from Christian scriptures, Origen talks about Greek daemons, like nature spirits and giants. These creatures were thought to inhabit nature or air and nourish from pagan sacrifices roaming the earth. However, there is no functional difference between the spirits of the underworld and of earth, since both have fallen from perfection into the material world. Origen sums them up as fallen angels and thus equal to demons.

Many ascetics, like Origen and Anthony the Great, described demons as psychological powers, tempting to evil, in contrast to benevolent angels advising good. According to Life of Anthony, written in Greek around 360 by Athanasius of Alexandria, most of the time, the demons were expressed as an internal struggle, inclinations, and temptations. But after Anthony successfully resisted the demons, they would appear in human form to tempt and threaten him even more intensely.

Pseudo-Dionysius the Areopagite described evil as "defiancy" and does not give evil an ontological existence. He explains demons are deficient creatures, who willingly turn themselves towards the unreal and non-existence. Their dangerous nature results not from the power of their nature, but from their tendency to drag others into the "void" and the unreal, away from God.

Michael Psellos proposed the existence of several types of demons, deeply influenced by the material nature of the regions they dwell. The highest and most powerful demons attack the mind of people using their "imaginative action" (phantastikos) to produce illusions in the mind. The lowest demons, on the other hand, are almost mindless, gross, and grunting spirits, which try to possess people instinctively, simply attracted by the warmth and life of humans. These cause diseases, fatal accidents and animalistic behavior in their victims. They are unable to speak, while other lower types of demons might give out false oracles. The demons are divided into:
Leliouria: The highest demons who inhabit the ether, beyond the moon
Aeria: Demons of the air below the moon
Chthonia: Inhabiting the land
Hyraia/Enalia: Dwelling in the water
Bypochtbonia: They live beneath the earth
Misophaes: The lowest type of demon, blind and almost senseless in the lowest hell
Invocation of Saints, holy men and women, especially ascetics, reading the Gospel, holy oil or water is said to drive them out. However, Psellos' schemes have been too inconsistent to answer questions about the hierarchy of fallen angels. The devil's position is impossible to assign in this scheme and it does not respond to living perceptions of felt experience and was considered rather impractical to have a lasting effect or impact on Christian demonology.

The contemporary Roman Catholic Church unequivocally teaches that angels and demons are real beings rather than just symbolic devices. The Catholic Church has a cadre of officially sanctioned exorcists which perform many exorcisms each year. The exorcists of the Catholic Church teach that demons attack humans continually but that afflicted persons can be effectively healed and protected either by the formal rite of exorcism, authorized to be performed only by bishops and those they designate, or by prayers of deliverance, which any Christian can offer for themselves or others.

At various times in Christian history, attempts have been made to classify demons according to various proposed demonic hierarchies.

Mandaeism 

In Mandaeism, the World of Darkness, also referred to as Sheol, is the underworld located below Tibil (Earth). It is ruled by its king Ur (Leviathan) and its queen Ruha, mother of the seven planets and twelve constellations. The great dark Ocean of Sup (or Suf) lies in the World of Darkness. The great dividing river of Hitpun, analogous to the river Styx in Greek mythology, separates the World of Darkness from the World of Light.
Prominent infernal beings found in the World of Darkness include lilith, nalai (vampire), niuli (hobgoblin), gadalta (ghost), satani (Satan) and various other demons and evil spirits.

Gnosticism 
Gnostic largely relies on Greek and Persian dualism, especially on Platonism. In accordance with Platonism, they regarded the idea as good while considering the material and conscious world to be inherently evil. The demonized star-deities of late Persian religion became associated with a demon, thus identifying the seven observable planets with a demonic ruler. These demons rule over the earth and the realm of planets, representing different desires and passions. According to Origen, the Ophites depicted the world as surrounded by the demonic Leviathan.

Like in Christianity, the term daimons was used for demons and refers to both the Archons as well as to their demonic assistants. Judas Iscariot is, in the Gospel of Judas, portrayed as the thirtheenth daimon for betraying Jesus and a supporter of the Archons.

Examples of Gnostic portrayals of demons can be found in the Apocryphon of John in which they are said to have helped construct the physical Adam and in Pistis Sophia which states they are ruled over by Hekate and punish corrupt souls.

Islam 

Shayāṭīn (or Daeva of Indo-Iranian religion) are the usual terms for demons in Islamic belief. In Islam demons try to lead humans astray from God, by tempting them to sin, teaching them sorcery and cause mischief among humans. Occult practises albeit not forbidden per se, may include conjuring demons, which requires acts against God's laws and are therefore forbidden, such as illicit blood-sacrifices, abandoning prayer and rejecting fasting. Based on the Islamic view on Solomon, who is widely believed to have been a ruler over genies and demons, Islam has a rich tradition about conjuring demons. Among the demons are the devils (shayatin) and the fiends (div). Both are believed to have worked for Solomon as slaves. While the devils usually appear within a Judeo-Christian background, the div frequently feature in beliefs of Persian and Indian origin. But it is to be noted that in Islam both angels and demons are considered to be the creatures of God and so God has ultimate power over all of them.

According to exegesis of the Quran the devils are the offspring of Iblis (Satan). They are said to live until the world ceases to exist, always shadow in humans (and jinn) whispering onto their hearts to lead them astray. Prayers are used to ward off their attacks, dissolving them temporarily. As the counterpart of the angels, they try to go against God's will and their abode in Hell is pre-destined. They lack free will and are bound to evil. The ifrit and marid are considered to be two more powerful classes of devils.

According to Abu Ali Bal'ami's work on the history of the world, Wahb ibn Munabbih explained that the divs were the first beings created by God. Some argue the devils were created good, but turned evil by Iblis' act of arrogance, the div were created as vicious creatures and embodiment of evil. When Iblis was still among the angels, he led an army against the spirits on the earth. Among them were the div, who formed two orders; one of which sided with the jinn and were banished with them, condemned to roam the earth. The other, treacherous div joined Iblis in battle, and was exiled to Hell with him. The div are often depicted as sorcerers whose misdeeds are not bound to temptation only. They could cause sickness, mental illnesses, or even turn humans to stone by touching. While the devils frequently appear to ordinary humans to tempt them into everything disapproved by society, the div usually appear to specific heroes.

Bahá'í Faith 
In the Bahá'í Faith, demons are not regarded as independent evil spirits as they are in some faiths. Rather, evil spirits described in various faiths' traditions, such as Satan, fallen angels, demons and jinn, are metaphors for the base character traits a human being may acquire and manifest when he turns away from God and follows his lower nature. Belief in the existence of ghosts and earthbound spirits is rejected and considered to be the product of superstition.

Ceremonial magic 
While some people fear demons, or attempt to exorcise them, others willfully attempt to summon them for knowledge, assistance, or power. The ceremonial magician usually consults a grimoire, which gives the names and abilities of demons as well as detailed instructions for conjuring and controlling them. Grimoires are not limited to demons – some give instructions for the invocation of deity, a process called theurgy. The use of ceremonial magic to call demons is also known as goetia, the name taken from a section in the famous grimoire known as the Lesser Key of Solomon.

Wicca 
According to Rosemary Ellen Guiley, "Demons are not courted or worshipped in contemporary Wicca and Paganism. The existence of negative energies is acknowledged."

Modern interpretations 

Psychologist Wilhelm Wundt remarked that "among the activities attributed by myths all over the world to demons, the harmful predominate, so that in popular belief bad demons are clearly older than good ones." Sigmund Freud developed this idea and claimed that the concept of demons was derived from the important relation of the living to the dead: "The fact that demons are always regarded as the spirits of those who have died recently shows better than anything the influence of mourning on the origin of the belief in demons."

M. Scott Peck, an American psychiatrist, wrote two books on the subject, People of the Lie: The Hope For Healing Human Evil and Glimpses of the Devil: A Psychiatrist's Personal Accounts of Possession, Exorcism, and Redemption. Peck describes in some detail several cases involving his patients. In People of the Lie he provides identifying characteristics of an evil person, whom he classified as having a character disorder. In Glimpses of the Devil Peck goes into significant detail describing how he became interested in exorcism in order to debunk the myth of possession by evil spirits – only to be convinced otherwise after encountering two cases which did not fit into any category known to psychology or psychiatry. Peck came to the conclusion that possession was a rare phenomenon related to evil and that possessed people are not actually evil; rather, they are doing battle with the forces of evil.

Although Peck's earlier work was met with widespread popular acceptance, his work on the topics of evil and possession has generated significant debate and derision. Much was made of his association with (and admiration for) the controversial Malachi Martin, a Roman Catholic priest and a former Jesuit, despite the fact that Peck consistently called Martin a liar and a manipulator. Richard Woods, a Roman Catholic priest and theologian, has claimed that Dr. Peck misdiagnosed patients based upon a lack of knowledge regarding dissociative identity disorder (formerly known as multiple personality disorder) and had apparently transgressed the boundaries of professional ethics by attempting to persuade his patients into accepting Christianity. Father Woods admitted that he has never witnessed a genuine case of demonic possession in all his years.

According to S. N. Chiu, God is shown sending a demon against Saul in 1 Samuel 16 and 18 in order to punish him for the failure to follow God's instructions, showing God as having the power to use demons for his own purposes, putting the demon under his divine authority. According to the Britannica Concise Encyclopedia, demons, despite being typically associated with evil, are often shown to be under divine control, and not acting of their own devices.

See also 

 Acheri
 Archon (Gnosticism)
 Classification of demons
 Empusa
 Erinyes
 Folk devil
 Goblin
 
 Imp
 List of fictional demons
 List of theological demons
 Mara (demon)
 Spiritual warfare
 Theistic Satanism
 Unclean spirit
 Yaoguai
 Yokai

Citations

General sources 
 
 
 
 Wundt, W. (1906). Mythus und Religion, Teil II (Völkerpsychologie, Band II). Leipzig.
 Castaneda, Carlos (1998). The Active Side of Infinity. HarperCollins NY. .

Further reading 
 
 Walton, John H., and J. Harvey Walton (2019). Demons and Spirits in Biblical Theology: Reading the Biblical Text in its Cultural and Literary Context.

Catholicism

External links 

 Catechism of the Catholic Church: Hyperlinked references to demons in the online Catechism of the Catholic Church
 Dictionary of the History of Ideas: Demonology
 Profile of William Bradshaw, American demonologist  Riverfront Times, St. Louis, Missouri, USA. August 2008.

 
Paranormal terminology
Religious terminology